The Thomas Coram Foundation for Children is a large children's charity in London which uses the working name Coram (formerly Coram Family).

It originated as part of England's oldest children's charity, the Foundling Hospital, established by royal charter in 1739.

Activities 
Coram is structured as an umbrella group of charities working with vulnerable children in different areas.
Coram's headquarters  are at Brunswick Square in London, but they work with children and young people across the UK and beyond.

Adoption and care 
Coram Adoption is an independent adoption service working in London, the East Midlands and Cambridgeshire.
They also work in partnership with local authorities. Their partnership with the London Borough of Harrow was the first use of the model.
Coram were also one of the pioneers of 'concurrent planning' (also known as 'foster to adopt'), and received government funding to become a 'National Centre of Excellence in Early Years Permanence' in 2012.
In 2015 the British Association for Adoption and Fostering went into administration. Coram took over many of the services in England, offering a total of £40,000 and taking on 50 of the 135 employees. The membership, training and research organisation became CoramBAAF. The Independent Review Mechanism (England) was taken over by Coram Children's Legal Centre. The National Adoption Register for England is now run by First4Adoption (jointly run by Coram and Adoption UK).

Coram also provides sheltered housing and support for care leavers.

Creative Therapies 
Coram provides creative therapies (art and music) for children, either in the new centre in London or in school and community settings in London, Kent, Cambridgeshire and the East Midlands.

Education 
Coram Life Education runs programmes in schools to educate children about health, wellbeing and drugs. It was formed in 2009 as an amalgamation between Coram and Life Education. Coram was already working with families affected by drug and alcohol abuse and the education programme allows it to work both on prevention and helping parents talk to their children about the issues.

Family support 
Coram offers support for separating parents, parents of adolescents, young parents, and parents of particular faith or ethnic groups. They offer particular support in Camden through their Parents Centre and Camden Futures (in collaboration with other agencies).
They also run the Family Drug and Alcohol Court in collaboration with the Tavistock and Portman NHS Foundation Trust. This team supports families going through care proceedings at the Central Family Court.

Legal advice and advocacy 
In 2011 the Children's Legal Centre and Coram were amalgamated into Coram Children's Legal Centre. The organisation offers free legal advice to children and people involved in their care, advice and training on the rights of young refugees and migrants, and international advocacy programmes.
In 2013 the charity Voice merged with Coram to form Coram Voice. It continues to campaign on behalf of children, and offer an advocacy service. The service visits children in residential care, secure children's homes and psychiatric units, and they also run an Independent Visitor Service for children with little family contact.
It also provides people to assist in investigations for complaints made under the Children Act 1989, and secure accommodation reviews.

Officers 

Dr Carol Homden CBE has been Coram's Chief Executive since 2007. Its Chair of Board of Trustees is Paul Curran, and its president is Sir David Bell.

History 

The Foundling Hospital was begun by the philanthropic sea captain Thomas Coram, who was appalled to see abandoned babies and children starving and dying in the streets of London. In 1742–1745 a building was erected north of Lamb's Conduit Street in Bloomsbury. Boys were housed in the West Wing of the new home. The East Wing was built in 1752 to house girls.

Popular artists of the 18th century became patrons and governors of the Foundling Hospital and donated some of their work to the foundation. The art collection contains works by William Hogarth, Thomas Gainsborough and Sir Joshua Reynolds, including a full-length portrait of Thomas Coram himself, along with musical scores by Handel including a fair copy of Messiah bequeathed in his will.

The Foundling Hospital became fashionable as a cause, a gallery and a concert hall. Governors of the hospital decided in 1926 to realise the value of the London site (it was sold for £2 million) and to build a new hospital on the Ashlyns site at Berkhamsted. The children were sent to temporary premises in Redhill until 1935 when the Georgian-style buildings in Berkhamsted were ready for occupation.

Hertfordshire County Council took responsibility for the school part of the hospital when it became Ashlyns School in 1951. Boarders at The Thomas Coram Foundation for Children were 'phased out' by 1955, when the Foundation sold the buildings to the County Council.

Foundling Museum 

The historic collections of the Foundling Hospital were moved in the 1920s to Brunswick Square, London, where a museum was established. In 1998 the building and collections were formally constituted as a separate charity, the Foundling Museum.

See also 
 List of organisations with a British royal charter

References

External links 
 Coram
 The Foundling Museum
 Old Coram Association

Organizations established in 1739
Charities based in London
Children's charities based in England
1739 establishments in England
Foundling Hospital
Organisations based in the London Borough of Camden